The Ramona Valley AVA is an American Viticultural Area located  northeast of the city of San Diego in San Diego County, California, centered on the community of Ramona. It was designated the 162nd American Viticultural Area in January, 2006 by the United States Department of the Treasury Alcohol and Tobacco Tax and Trade Bureau, which recognized the area for its distinctive microclimate, elevation, and soil attributes. Geographically, the Ramona Valley is described as being a broad, flat valley ringed by hills and mountains that isolate it from the surrounding areas.

Climate and geography
Located within the large multi-county South Coast AVA, Ramona Valley was the third AVA to be designated in Southern California, after San Pasqual Valley AVA in 1981 and Temecula Valley AVA in 1984.

Wine production
As of 2016, there were over 20 bonded wineries operating in the AVA.

See also
California wine

References

External links
 Alcohol and Tobacco Tax and Trade Bureau's published ruling
 Ramona Valley Winery Association, Facebook
 Ramona Vineyard Association

American Viticultural Areas of California
American Viticultural Areas of Southern California
Ramona, San Diego County, California
Valleys of San Diego County, California
Geography of San Diego County, California
American Viticultural Areas
2006 establishments in California